Büyükmandıra (or Mandıra for short) is a belde (town) town in Babaeski district of Kırklareli Province, Turkey. The population of the town is 3688 as of 2011. Up to 1877 there was an Ottoman royal farm in place of the town. But during the Russo-Turkish War (1877-1878) Muslim people from Bulgaria Pomaks who escaped from the Russian armies were settled in the farm to form the core of the town. According to the mayor's page, a well known wrestler named Kavasoğlu İbrahim arranged  this allocation. The settlement was declared a seat of township in 1955. The name of the town means "great dairy" and it refers to the main activity of town residents.

References

Populated places in Kırklareli Province
Towns in Turkey
Babaeski District